Spetters (English translation: Splashes) is a Dutch film released in 1980 and directed by Paul Verhoeven. The film follows the lives of three young men who have little in common but their love for dirt-bike racing. Set on the outskirts of Rotterdam, the film depicts three characters who are hoping to escape a dead-end, working-class existence.

Each of the boys is seduced by a young woman who, with her brother, sells French fries and hot dogs at the races. She is looking for the person who will help her get out of the business and away from her brother. The motocross racers want to make their marks as professional racers, but their hopes don't go according to their plans.

Spetters led to protests about how Verhoeven portrayed gays, Christians, the police, and the press. Although Verhoeven made one more film in the Netherlands, the response to Spetters led him to leave for Hollywood. Despite the large amount of controversy surrounding it, the film proved to be popular, with 1,124,162 admissions in the Netherlands alone.

The film was a small success in the United States, and it helped launch the Hollywood careers of Verhoeven and some of the actors, including Jeroen Krabbé, Rutger Hauer and Renee Soutendijk.

The town of Maassluis was the setting for the movie.

Plot
Two young motocross racers, Rien (Hans van Tongeren) and Hans (Maarten Spanjer), and their mechanic, Eef (Toon Agterberg), dream of fame, fortune and casual sex. Their hero is legendary motocross champion Gerrit Witkamp (Rutger Hauer), who inspires their competitive rides. Their lives are changed when they meet a young seductress named Fientje (Renée Soutendijk). Eventually, she makes the three men face the reality of success, defeat and homosexuality.

Cast
 Hans van Tongeren as Rien
 Renée Soutendijk as Fientje
 Toon Agterberg as Eef
 Maarten Spanjer as Hans
 Marianne Boyer as Maya
 Peter Tuinman as Jaap
 Saskia van Basten-Batenburg (credited as Saskia Ten Batenburg) as Truus 
 Yvonne Valkenburg as Annette
 Ab Abspoel (credited as Albert Abspoel) as Rien's Father 
 Rudi Falkenhagen as Hans' Father
 Hans Veerman as Eef's Father
 Ben Aerden as Elderly Homosexual
 Kitty Courbois as Doctor
 Margot Keune as Girl On Moped
 Jonna Koster as Gerrit's Wife
 Gees Linnebank as Homosexual
 Hugo Metsers as a Hell's Angel
 Peter Oosthoek as Priest
 Jeroen Krabbé as Frans Henkhof
 Rutger Hauer as Gerrit Witkamp
 Bruni Heinke as Mother In Car
 Herman Vinck as Driver

Title
"Spetter" (plural: "spetters") means 'good looking boy or girl', comparable to the American hunk and babe. It also means "splatters" and thereby refers to dirt splattering up while motorcrossing as well as the oil splattering when Soutendijk's character lowers the chips into the frying pan at the chips stall where she works.

Film rating
 The film is classified as R18 in New Zealand.

References

External links
 
 
 
 Symbolic Power and Religious Impotence in Paul Verhoeven’s Spetters in Journal of Religion and Film, October 2003

1980 films
Dutch coming-of-age films
1980s Dutch-language films
Films directed by Paul Verhoeven
Dutch LGBT-related films
1980 LGBT-related films
Motorcycle racing films
Dutch erotic drama films
1980s erotic drama films
Films set in the Netherlands
Dutch sports films
Dutch teen films
1980 drama films